Cyanophthalma is a genus of ribbon worms belonging to the family Tetrastemmatidae.

The species of this genus are found in Europe and Northern America.

Species:
 Cyanophthalma cordiceps (Jensen, 1878) 
 Cyanophthalma obscura (Schultze, 1851)

References

Tetrastemmatidae
Nemertea genera